Mangala Kumara (born 12 January 1987) is a Sri Lankan first-class cricketer. He made his first-class debut for Lankan Cricket Club in Tier B of the 2008–09 Premier Trophy on 14 November 2008. He made his List A debut for Lankan Cricket Club in the 2008–09 Premier Limited Overs Tournament on 19 November 2008.

References

External links
 

1987 births
Living people
Sri Lankan cricketers
Kalutara Town Club cricketers
Lankan Cricket Club cricketers
Polonnaruwa District cricketers
Ragama Cricket Club cricketers
Seeduwa Raddoluwa Cricket Club cricketers